The 2016 Oceania Handball Champions Cup was held at Geelong, Victoria between June 2–5, 2016 in conjunction with the 2016 Australian Handball Club Championship. 

In the event has seven teams from Australia and New Caledonia entered. The Australian teams dominated with Sydney University winning their fifth straight title over West Adelaide. Two time runners up St Kilda HC came third from University of Technology Sydney in fourth. Surprise packet Wolves HC consisting of mainly of the Australian Junior team players finished fifth, with Olympique de Nouméa sixth and Deakin University seventh.

Results

Round Robin - Pool A

Round Robin - Pool B

Fifth-Seventh round robin

Semi Final round robin

Fifth Place Play off

Third Place playoff

Final

Final standings - Men

References

External references
 Competition details on Handball Australia webpage
 NSW CLUBS TO COMPETE IN AUSTRALIAN CHAMPIONSHIPS. NSWHF webpage. 31 May 2016.
 Geelong ready to host Oceania club championships. Handball Australia. 1 June 2016.
 Sydney University aiming to defend title. 2 June 2016.
 Draw on Handball Victoria Webpage
 Day three report. Handball Australia. 4 June 2016. 

Handball competitions in Australia
Oceania Club Championship
Oceania Club Championship
Oceania Handball Club Championship